The Buru thrush (Geokichla dumasi) is a species of bird in the family Turdidae. It is endemic to montane rainforest on Buru in Indonesia. Traditionally, it included the Seram thrush as a subspecies, in which case the common name of the 'combined species' was Moluccan thrush.

References

Buru thrush
Birds of Buru
Buru thrush
Taxonomy articles created by Polbot